The Yuzivska gas field is an unconventional Ukrainian natural gas field that was discovered in 2010. It was expected to begin production in 2017, but development was halted because of the outbreak of the 2014 war in the Donbas region near the field, a sharp plunge in European natural gas prices (making the costly shale gas development less profitable), and opposition from local residents.

Background
Ukraine's largest natural gas fields are about 80-85% depleted although there are still large quantities of unexploited gas reserves stored in hard-to-reach areas or solid rock, including the Yuzivska gas field.

Since December 2020, the rights to the Yuzivska gas field has been held by the Nadra Yuzivska company, which is owned by Ukraine's state-owned Naftogaz.

Extraction
The Yuzivska block covers an area of 7,886 km2. The total proven reserves of the Yuzivska gas field are around 70.8 trillion cubic feet (2000×109m³) and production is slated to be around 960 million cubic feet/day (27.4×106m³). Studies indicate that the field would be capable of delivering up to 10 bcm of natural gas annually, which is almost a third of Ukraine's annual natural gas consumption.

The reservoir that holds the gas has low permeability and low porosity (compared to other large natural gas fields in Ukraine) and therefore requires unconventional methods of extraction. The total exploration investment is expected to range between 250 to 300 million USD.

See also

References

Natural gas fields in Ukraine